Sergei Nailevich Gimayev (1 January 1955 – 18 March 2017) was a Soviet professional ice hockey player who played ten seasons (1976–86) in the Soviet Championship League with HC CSKA Moscow and Leningrad SKA. After the end of his career as a player, Gimayev worked as a TV sports presenter. He was an ethnic Tatar.

Gimayev died on 18 March 2017 in Tula at the age of 62.

References

External links

1955 births
2017 deaths
People from Pruzhany
HC CSKA Moscow players
Honoured Coaches of Russia
Ice hockey commentators
SKA Saint Petersburg players
Soviet ice hockey defencemen
Recipients of the Order of Honour (Russia)
Russian sports journalists
Tatar sportspeople
Tatar people of Russia